Touchdown Glacier is a tributary of Darwin Glacier, flowing south between Roadend Nunatak and the Brown Hills. Mapped by the Victoria University of Wellington Antarctic Expedition (VUWAE) (1962–63) and so named because the glacier was used as a landing site for aircraft supporting the expedition.

Glaciers of Oates Land